Mr. Big Cartoons was an animation studio that was located in Australia.  Its first work was for Hanna-Barbera in the late 1980s and during the 1990s, along with animating a few episodes of The Ren & Stimpy Show for Games Animation in 1994–1996 (such as "Blazing Entrails"). Mr. Big was acquired by Southern Star Group in 1997.

See also

List of film production companies
List of television production companies

References

Australian animation studios
Companies disestablished in 1997
Companies with year of establishment missing